

Events

Pre-1600 
534 – The second and final edition of the Code of Justinian comes into effect in the Byzantine Empire.
999 – Battle of Glenmama: The combined forces of Munster and Meath under king Brian Boru inflict a crushing defeat on the allied armies of Leinster and Dublin near Lyons Hill in Ireland.
1066 – Granada massacre: A Muslim mob storms the royal palace in Granada, crucifies Jewish vizier Joseph ibn Naghrela and massacres most of the Jewish population of the city.
1419 – Hundred Years' War: Battle of La Rochelle.
1460 – Wars of the Roses: Lancastrians kill the 3rd Duke of York and win the Battle of Wakefield.

1601–1900
1702 – Queen Anne's War: James Moore, Governor of the Province of Carolina, abandons the Siege of St. Augustine.
1813 – War of 1812: British soldiers burn Buffalo, New York.
1816 – The Treaty of St. Louis between the United States and the united Ottawa, Ojibwa, and Potawatomi Indian tribes is proclaimed.
1825 – The Treaty of St. Louis between the United States and the Shawnee Nation is proclaimed.
1853 – Gadsden Purchase: The United States buys land from Mexico to facilitate railroad building in the Southwest.
1890 – Following the Wounded Knee Massacre, the United States Army and Lakota warriors face off in the Drexel Mission Fight.
1896 – Filipino patriot and reform advocate José Rizal is executed by a Spanish firing squad in Manila.
  1896   – Canadian ice hockey player Ernie McLea scores the first hat-trick in Stanley Cup play, and the Cup-winning goal as the Montreal Victorias defeat the Winnipeg Victorias 6–5.
1897 – The British Colony of Natal annexes Zululand.

1901–present
1902 – The Discovery Expedition under Robert Falcon Scott attained a Farthest South at 82°17′S in Antarctica.
1903 – A fire at the Iroquois Theater in Chicago, Illinois kills at least 605.
1905 – Former Idaho Governor Frank Steunenberg is assassinated at the front gate of his home in Caldwell.
1906 – The All-India Muslim League is founded in Dacca, East Bengal, British India (later Dhaka, Bangladesh). 
1916 – Russian mystic and advisor to the Tsar Grigori Yefimovich Rasputin is murdered by a loyalist group led by Prince Felix Yusupov. His frozen, partially-trussed body was discovered in a Petrograd river three days later.
  1916   – The last coronation in Hungary is performed for King Charles IV and Queen Zita.
1922 – The Union of Soviet Socialist Republics (USSR) is formed.
1927 – The Ginza Line, the first subway line in Asia, opens in Tokyo, Japan.
1935 – The Italian Air Force bombs a Swedish Red Cross hospital during the Second Italo-Abyssinian War.
1936 – The Flint sit-down strike hits General Motors.
1943 – Subhas Chandra Bose raises the flag of Indian independence at Port Blair.
1944 – King George II of Greece declares a regency, leaving the throne vacant.
1947 – Cold War: King Michael I of Romania is forced to abdicate by the Soviet Union-backed Communist government of Romania.
1952 – An RAF Avro Lancaster bomber crashes in Luqa, Malta after an engine failure, killing three crew members and a civilian on the ground.
1954 – The Finnish National Bureau of Investigation is established to consolidate criminal investigation and intelligence into a single agency.
1958 – The Guatemalan Air Force sinks several Mexican fishing boats alleged to have breached maritime borders, killing three and sparking international tension.
1967 – Aeroflot Flight L-51 crashes near Liepāja International Airport in Liepāja, Latvia, killing 43.
1972 – Vietnam War: Operation Linebacker II ends.
1987 – Stella Sigcau, Prime minister of the South African Bantustan of Transkei, is ousted from power in a bloodless military coup led by General Bantu Holomisa.
1993 – Israel establishes diplomatic relations with Vatican City and also upgrades to full diplomatic relations with Ireland.
1996 – Proposed budget cuts by Benjamin Netanyahu spark protests from 250,000 workers who shut down services across Israel.
1997 – In the worst incident in Algeria's insurgency, the Wilaya of Relizane massacres, 400 people from four villages are killed.
2000 – Rizal Day bombings: A series of bombs explode in various places in Metro Manila, Philippines within a period of a few hours, killing 22 and injuring about a hundred.
2004 – A fire in the República Cromagnon nightclub in Buenos Aires, Argentina, kills 194.
2005 – Tropical Storm Zeta forms in the open Atlantic Ocean, tying the record for the latest tropical cyclone ever to form in the North Atlantic basin.
2006 – Madrid–Barajas Airport is bombed.
  2006   – The Indonesian passenger ferry  sinks in a storm, resulting in at least 400 deaths.
  2006   – Former President of Iraq Saddam Hussein is executed. 
  2009   – A suicide bomber kills nine people at Forward Operating Base Chapman, a key facility of the Central Intelligence Agency in Afghanistan.
2013 – More than 100 people are killed when anti-government forces attack key buildings in Kinshasa, Democratic Republic of the Congo.

Births

Pre–1600 
AD 39 – Titus, Roman emperor (probable; d. 81)
 159 – Empress Dowager Bian, second wife of Cao Cao, mother of Cao Wei's first emperor, Cao Pi (d. 230)
1204 – Abû 'Uthmân Sa'îd ibn Hakam al Qurashi, ruler of Minorca (d. 1282)
1371 – Vasily I of Moscow (d. 1425)
1490 – Ebussuud Efendi, Ottoman lawyer and jurist (d. 1574)
1548 – David Pareus, German theologian (d. 1622)
1578 – Ulrik of Denmark, Danish prince-bishop (d. 1624)

1601–1900
1642 – Vincenzo da Filicaja, Italian poet (d. 1707)
1673 – Ahmed III, Ottoman sultan (d. 1736)
1678 – William Croft, English organist and composer (d. 1727)
1722 – Charles Yorke, English lawyer and politician, Lord Chancellor of Great Britain (d. 1770)
1724 – Louis-Jean-François Lagrenée, French painter and educator (d. 1805)
1757 – Sebastián Kindelán y O'Regan, colonial governor of East Florida, Santo Domingo and Cuba (d. 1826)
1760 – Charles Sapinaud de La Rairie, French general (d. 1829)
1792 – Sylvester Jordan, German lawyer and politician (d. 1861)
1819 – Theodor Fontane, German author and poet (d. 1898)
  1819   – John W. Geary, American lawyer and politician, 16th Governor of Pennsylvania (d. 1873)
1825 – Samuel Newitt Wood, American lawyer and politician (d. 1891)
1842 – Osman Hamdi Bey, Ottoman administrator, intellectual, art expert and painter (d. 1910)
1849 – John Milne, English seismologist and geologist (d. 1913)
1851 – Asa Griggs Candler, American businessman and politician, 44th Mayor of Atlanta (d. 1929)
1853 – André Messager, French pianist, composer, and conductor (d. 1929)
1857 – Sylvio Lazzari, French-Austrian composer (d. 1944)
1865 – Rudyard Kipling, Indian-English author and poet, Nobel Prize laureate (d. 1936)
1869 – Stephen Leacock, English-Canadian political scientist and author (d. 1944)
  1869   – Ōzutsu Man'emon, Japanese sumo wrestler, the 18th Yokozuna (d. 1918)
1873 – Al Smith, American lawyer and politician, 42nd Governor of New York (d. 1944)
1878 – William Aberhart, Canadian evangelist and politician, seventh Premier of Alberta (d. 1943)
1879 – Ramana Maharshi, Indian guru and philosopher (d. 1950)
1883 – Archer Baldwin, American-English farmer and politician (d. 1966)
  1883   – Lester Patrick, Canadian ice hockey player and coach (d. 1960)
1884 – Hideki Tōjō, Japanese general and politician, 40th Prime Minister of Japan (d. 1948)
1886 – Austin Osman Spare, English artist and occultist (d. 1956)
1887 – William Kolehmainen, Finnish-American runner and coach (d. 1967)
  1887   – K.M.Munshi, Indian politician, writer and educationist, founder of Bharatiya Vidya Bhavan (d. 1971)
1890 – Adolfo Ruiz Cortines, Mexican soldier and politician, 47th President of Mexico (d. 1973)
1897 – Alfredo Bracchi, Italian songwriter and screenwriter (d. 1976)
1899 – Helge Ingstad, Norwegian explorer, lawyer, and politician, 2nd Governor of Svalbard (d. 2001)

1901–present
1904 – Dmitry Kabalevsky, Russian composer and academic (d. 1987)
1905 – Daniil Kharms, Russian poet, author, and playwright (d. 1942)
1906 – Alziro Bergonzo, Italian architect and painter (d. 1997)
  1906   – Carol Reed, English director and producer (d. 1976)
1910 – Paul Bowles, American composer and author (d. 1999)
1911 – Jeanette Nolan, American actress (d. 1998)
1913 – Lucio Agostini, Italian-Canadian conductor and composer (d. 1996)
  1913   – Elyne Mitchell, Australian author (d. 2002)
1914 – Bert Parks, American actor, singer, television personality, and beauty pageant host (d. 1992)
1917 – Seymour Melman, American engineer and author (d. 2004)
1919 – Dick Spooner, English cricketer (d. 1997)
  1919   – David Willcocks, English organist, composer, and conductor (d. 2015)
1921 – Rashid Karami, Lebanese lawyer and politician, 32nd Prime Minister of Lebanon (d. 1987)
1922 – Jane Langton, American author and illustrator (d. 2018)
1923 – Prakash Vir Shastri, Indian academic and politician (d. 1977)
1924 – Yvonne Brill, Canadian-American propulsion engineer (d. 2013)
1925 – Ian MacNaughton, Scottish actor, producer, and director (d. 2002)
1926 – Stan Tracey, English pianist and composer (d. 2013)
1927 – Jan Kubíček, Czech painter and sculptor (d. 2013)
1928 – Bo Diddley, American singer-songwriter and guitarist (d. 2008)
1929 – Rosalinde Hurley, English physician, microbiologist, and academic (d. 2004)
1930 – Roy Yorke Calne, English surgeon and academic
  1930   – Elmira Minita Gordon, Belizean educator, 1st Governor-General of Belize (d. 2021)
  1930   – Red Rhodes, American pedal steel guitarist (d. 1995)
  1930   – Tu Youyou, Chinese chemist and pharmacist, Nobel Prize laureate
1931 – Skeeter Davis, American singer-songwriter (d. 2004)
  1931   – John T. Houghton, Welsh physicist and author (d. 2020)
  1931   – Frank Torre, American baseball player and manager (d. 2014)
1933 – Timité Bassori, Ivorian filmmaker, actor, and writer
1934 – John N. Bahcall, American astrophysicist and astronomer, co-developed the Hubble Space Telescope (d. 2005)
  1934   – Joseph Bologna, American actor, director, and screenwriter (d. 2017)
  1934   – Barry Briggs, New Zealand motorcycle racer and sportscaster
  1934   – Joseph P. Hoar, American general
  1934   – Del Shannon, American singer-songwriter and guitarist (d. 1990)
  1934   – Russ Tamblyn, American actor
1935 – Omar Bongo, Gabonese lieutenant and politician, President of Gabon (d. 2009)
  1935   – Sandy Koufax, American baseball player and sportscaster
  1935   – Jack Riley, American actor (d. 2016)
1937 – Gordon Banks, English footballer and manager (d. 2019)
  1937   – John Hartford, American singer-songwriter and fiddler (d. 2001)
  1937   – Jim Marshall, American football player
  1937   – Paul Stookey, American singer-songwriter and guitarist 
1938 – Ron Wolf, American Football Hall of Fame General Manager
1939 – Glenda Adams, Australian author and academic (d. 2007)
  1939   – Felix Pappalardi, American singer-songwriter, bass player, and producer (d. 1983)
1940 – James Burrows, American actor, director, producer, and screenwriter
1941 – Mel Renfro, American football player and coach
1942 – Vladimir Bukovsky, Russian author and activist (d. 2019)
  1942   – Guy Edwards, English race car driver
  1942   – Michael Nesmith, American singer-songwriter, guitarist, and actor (d. 2021) 
  1942   – Janko Prunk, Slovenian historian, academic, and politician
  1942   – Robert Quine, American guitarist (d. 2004)
  1942   – Toomas Savi, Estonian physician and politician
  1942   – Fred Ward, American actor (d. 2022) 
1944 – William J. Fallon, American admiral
  1944   – Joseph Hilbe, American mathematician and philosopher (d. 2017)
1945 – Davy Jones, English singer-songwriter and actor (d. 2012)
  1945   – Lloyd Kaufman, American director, producer, and screenwriter, co-founded Troma Entertainment
  1945   – Paola Pigni, Italian runner (d. 2021)
  1945   – Concetta Tomei, American actress
1946 – Clive Bunker, English drummer and songwriter 
  1946   – Patti Smith, American singer-songwriter and poet
  1946   – Berti Vogts, German footballer and coach
1947 – James Kahn, American author, screenwriter, and producer
  1947   – Jeff Lynne, English singer-songwriter, guitarist, and producer 
  1947   – Steve Mix, American basketball player and coach
1948 – Jed Johnson, American interior designer and director (d. 1996)
1949 – David Bedford, English runner
  1949   – Jerry Coyne, American biologist and author
  1949   – Jim Flaherty, Canadian lawyer and politician, 37th Canadian Minister of Finance (d. 2014)
1950 – Timothy Mo, Chinese-English author
  1950   – Lewis Shiner, American journalist and author
  1950   – Bjarne Stroustrup, Danish computer scientist, created the C++ programming language
  1950   – Martti Vainio, Finnish runner
1951 – Doug Allder, English footballer and coach
  1951   – Chris Jasper, American musician, singer-songwriter, and producer
  1951   – Nick Rose, English runner
1952 – June Anderson, American soprano and actress
1953 – Daniel T. Barry, American engineer and astronaut
  1953   – Dana Key, American singer, guitarist, and producer (d. 2010)
  1953   – Graham Vick, English director and producer
  1953   – Meredith Vieira, American journalist and game show host
1954 – Barry Greenstein, American poker player and philanthropist
1956 – Ingus Baušķenieks, Latvian singer-songwriter and producer 
  1956   – Suzy Bogguss, American country singer-songwriter and guitarist
  1956   – Patricia Kalember, American actress
  1956   – Sheryl Lee Ralph, American actress and singer
1957 – Matt Lauer, American television journalist and anchor 
  1957   – Glenn Robbins, Australian comedian and actor
1958 – Pedro Costa, Portuguese director, screenwriter, and cinematographer
  1958   – Steven Smith, American engineer and astronaut
1959 – Antonio Pappano, English pianist and conductor
  1959   – Kåre Thomsen, Norwegian guitarist and graphic designer
  1959   – Tracey Ullman, English-American actress, singer, director, and screenwriter
  1959   – Josée Verner, Canadian politician, 8th Canadian Minister of Intergovernmental Affairs
1960 – Richard M. Durbin, English biologist and academic
1961 – Douglas Coupland, German-Canadian author and playwright
  1961   – Bill English, New Zealand farmer and politician, 39th Prime Minister of New Zealand
  1961   – Sean Hannity, American radio and television host
  1961   – Ben Johnson, Jamaican-Canadian sprinter
  1961   – Charlie Nicholas, Scottish footballer and sportscaster
1963 – Chandler Burr, American journalist and author
  1963   – Mike Pompeo, American diplomat and politician; 70th United States Secretary of State
  1963   – Milan Šrejber, Czech tennis player
1964 – Almir Kayumov, Russian footballer and referee (d. 2013)
  1964   – Sylvie Moreau, Canadian actress and screenwriter
  1964   – George Newbern, American actor
1965 – Heidi Fleiss, American procurer 
1966 – Gary Chartier, American philosopher, scholar, and academic
  1966   – Bennett Miller, American director and producer
1967 – Carl Ouellet, Canadian wrestler and sportscaster
1968 – Bryan Burk, American screenwriter and producer
  1968   – Adam Dale, Australian cricketer
  1968   – Sandra Glover, American hurdler
  1968   – Albano Mucci, Australian activist
1969 – Emmanuel Clérico, French race car driver
  1969   – Dave England, American snowboarder and stuntman
  1969   – Jay Kay, British singer-songwriter and lead singer of Jamiroquai
  1969   – Kersti Kaljulaid, President of Estonia
  1969   – Michelle McGann, American golfer
  1969   – Meredith Monroe, American actress
1971 – Sister Bliss, English keyboard player, songwriter, and producer 
  1971   – C. S. Lee, Korean-American actor
  1971   – Ricardo, Spanish footballer and manager
  1971   – Manuela Schmermund, German Paralympic sport shooter
1972 – Daniel Amokachi, Nigerian footballer and manager 
  1972   – Paul Keegan, Irish footballer
  1972   – Dita Indah Sari, Indonesian trade union leader and activist
  1972   – Steven Wiig, American actor and drummer 
1973 – Jason Behr, American actor
  1973   – Ato Boldon, Trinidadian runner, sportscaster, and politician
1974 – Alexandro Alves do Nascimento, Brazilian footballer (d. 2012)
1975 – Scott Chipperfield, Australian footballer
  1975   – Tiger Woods, American golfer
1976 – Kastro, American rapper 
  1976   – Patrick Kerney, American football player
  1976   – A. J. Pierzynski, American baseball player and sportscaster
1977 – Laila Ali, American boxer and actress
  1977   – Glory Alozie, Nigerian-Spanish sprinter and hurdler
  1977   – Grant Balfour, Australian baseball player
  1977   – Saša Ilić, Serbian footballer
  1977   – Scott Lucas, Australian footballer and coach
  1977   – Kenyon Martin, American basketball player
  1977   – Lucy Punch, English actress
  1977   – Kazuyuki Toda, Japanese footballer
1978 – Devin Brown, American basketball player
  1978   – Tyrese Gibson, American singer-songwriter, producer, and actor
  1978   – Phillips Idowu, English triple jumper
  1978   – Zbigniew Robert Promiński, Polish drummer 
  1978   – Rob Scuderi, American ice hockey player
1979 – Michael Grimm, American singer-songwriter and guitarist
  1979   – Yelawolf, American rapper, singer, songwriter and producer
1980 – Eliza Dushku, American actress and producer
  1980   – D. J. Mbenga, Congolese-Belgian basketball player
  1980   – Alison McGovern, British politician
1981 – Cédric Carrasso, French footballer
  1981   – Ali Al-Habsi, Omani footballer
  1981   – Michael Rodríguez, Costa Rican footballer
  1981   – Matt Ulrich, American football player
1982 – Kristin Kreuk, Canadian actress 
  1982   – Tobias Kurbjuweit, German footballer
  1982   – Dawan Landry, American football player
  1982   – Dathan Ritzenhein, American runner
1983 – Davide Mandorlini, Italian footballer
  1983   – Eddie Edwards, American professional wrestler
  1983   – Nick Symmonds, American runner
  1983   – Kevin Systrom, American computer programmer and businessman, co-founded Instagram
1984 – Randall Azofeifa, Costa Rican footballer
  1984   – Andra Day, American singer and songwriter
  1984   – LeBron James, American basketball player, producer and businessman
1985 – Lars Boom, Dutch cyclist
  1985   – Bryson Goodwin, Australian rugby league player
1986 – Domenico Criscito, Italian footballer
  1986   – Ellie Goulding, English singer-songwriter and producer
  1986   – Gianni Zuiverloon, Dutch footballer
  1986   – Caity Lotz, American actress
1989 – Ryan Sheckler, American skateboarder and entrepreneur
  1989   – Kateřina Vaňková, Czech tennis player
  1989   – Yoon Bo-ra, South Korean singer, rapper and actress
1990 – Joe Root, English cricketer
  1990   – Bruno Henrique Pinto, Brazilian footballer
1991 – Camila Giorgi, Italian tennis player
1992 – Ryan Tunnicliffe, English footballer
  1992   – Carson Wentz, American football player
1995 – V, South Korean singer and actor
1995 – Igor Shesterkin, Russian hockey goaltender
1996 – Brad Abbey, New Zealand rugby league player

Deaths

Pre-1600
 274 – Pope Felix I
 717 – Egwin of Evesham, bishop of Worcester
 903 – Tian Jun, Chinese warlord (b. 858)
 925 – Wang Shenzhi, founder of Min (b. 862)
1115 – Theodoric II, Duke of Lorraine 
1331 – Bernard Gui, inquisitor (b. 1261 or 1262)
1435 – Bonne of Berry, Regent of Savoy (b. 1362)
1436 – Louis III, Elector Palatine (b. 1378)
1460 – Edmund, Earl of Rutland, Irish politician, Lord Chancellor of Ireland (b. 1443)
  1460   – Richard of York, 3rd Duke of York (b. 1411)
1525 – Jakob Fugger, German banker and businessman (b. 1459)
1572 – Galeazzo Alessi, Italian architect, designed the Basilica of Santa Maria degli Angeli (b. 1512)
1573 – Giovanni Battista Giraldi, Italian author and poet (b. 1504)
1591 – Pope Innocent IX (b. 1519)

1601–1900
1621 – Job of Manyava, Ukrainian monk and saint (b. 1550)
1640 – John Francis Regis, French priest and saint (b. 1597)
1643 – Giovanni Baglione, Italian painter and historian of art (b. 1566)
1644 – Jan Baptist van Helmont, Flemish chemist, physiologist, and physician (b. 1577)
1662 – Ferdinand Charles, Archduke of Austria (b. 1628)
1769 – Nicholas Taaffe, 6th Viscount Taaffe, Irish-Austrian soldier and courtier (b. 1685)
1777 – Maximilian III Joseph, Elector of Bavaria (b. 1727)
1788 – Francesco Zuccarelli, Italian painter and academic (b. 1702)
1803 – Francis Lewis, Welsh-American merchant and politician (b. 1713)
1879 – Manuel de Araújo Porto-Alegre, Baron of Santo Ângelo, Brazilian poet and painter (b. 1806)
1885 – Martha Darley Mutrie, British painter (b. 1824)
1896 – José Rizal, Filipino ophthalmologist, journalist, and author (b. 1861)

1901–present
1906 – Josephine Butler, English feminist and social reformer (b. 1828)
1908 – Thomas-Alfred Bernier, Canadian journalist, lawyer, and politician (b. 1844)
1916 – Grigori Rasputin, Russian mystic (b. 1869)
1928 – Jean Collas, French rugby player and tug of war competitor (b. 1874)
1937 – Hans Niels Andersen, Danish businessman, founded the East Asiatic Company (b. 1852)
1940 – Childe Wills, American engineer (b. 1878)
1941 – El Lissitzky, Russian photographer and architect (b. 1890)
1944 – Romain Rolland, French author and playwright, Nobel Prize laureate (b. 1866)
1945 – Song Jin-woo, South Korean journalist and politician (b. 1889)
1947 – Han van Meegeren, Dutch painter (b. 1889)
  1947   – Alfred North Whitehead, English-American mathematician and philosopher (b. 1861)
1954 – Archduke Eugen of Austria (b. 1863)
1955 – Rex Ingamells, Australian poet and author (b. 1913)
1967 – Vincent Massey, Canadian lawyer and politician, 18th Governor General of Canada (b. 1887)
1968 – Trygve Lie, Norwegian journalist and politician, first Secretary-General of the United Nations (b. 1896)
1970 – Sonny Liston, American boxer (b. 1932)
1971 – Jo Cals, Dutch lawyer and politician, Prime Minister of the Netherlands (b. 1914)
  1971   – Vikram Sarabhai, Indian physicist and academic (b. 1919)
1979 – Richard Rodgers, American playwright and composer (b. 1902)
1982 – Alberto Vargas, Peruvian-American painter and illustrator (b. 1896)
1983 – Violette Cordery, English race car driver (b. 1900)
1986 – Era Bell Thompson, American journalist (b. 1905)
1988 – Yuli Daniel, Russian author and poet (b. 1925)
  1988   – Isamu Noguchi, American sculptor and landscaper (b. 1904)
1990 – Raghuvir Sahay, Indian author, poet, and critic (b. 1929)
1992 – Romeo Muller, American actor, screenwriter, for screenplays like the 1964, Rudolph the Red-Nosed Reindeer (TV special) (b. 1928)
1993 – İhsan Sabri Çağlayangil, Turkish lawyer and politician, 20th Turkish Minister of Foreign Affairs (b. 1908)
  1993   – Irving "Swifty" Lazar, American talent agent (b. 1907)
  1993   – Giuseppe Occhialini, Italian-French physicist and academic (b. 1907)
1994 – Dmitri Ivanenko, Ukrainian-Russian physicist and academic (b. 1904)
1995 – Ralph Flanagan, American pianist, composer, and conductor (b. 1914)
  1995   – Doris Grau, American voice actor and script supervisor (b. 1924)
1996 – Lew Ayres, American actor (b. 1908)
1997 – Shinichi Hoshi, Japanese author and illustrator (b. 1926)
1998 – Sam Muchnick, American wrestling promoter, co-founded the National Wrestling Alliance (b. 1905)
1999 – Joff Ellen, Australian comedian and actor (b. 1915)
  1999   – Fritz Leonhardt, German engineer, co-designed the Cologne Rodenkirchen Bridge and Fernsehturm Stuttgart (b. 1909)
  1999   – Des Renford, Australian swimmer (b. 1927)
  1999   – Sarah Knauss, American supercentenarian (b. 1880)
2000 – Julius J. Epstein, American screenwriter and producer (b. 1909)
2002 – Mary Brian, American actress (b. 1906)
  2002   – Eleanor J. Gibson, American psychologist and academic (b. 1910)
  2002   – Mary Wesley, English author (b. 1912)
2003 – John Gregory Dunne, American novelist, screenwriter, and critic (b. 1932)
2004 – Artie Shaw, American clarinet player, composer, and bandleader (b. 1910)
2005 – Eddie Barlow, South African cricketer and coach (b. 1940)
  2005   – Rona Jaffe, American novelist (b. 1932)
2006 – Saddam Hussein, Iraqi general and politician, fifth President of Iraq (b. 1937)
  2006   – Terry Peck, Falkland Islander police officer and spy (b. 1938)
  2006   – Michel Plasse, Canadian ice hockey player (b. 1948)
2009 – Rowland S. Howard, Australian singer-songwriter and guitarist (b. 1959)
  2009   – Abdurrahman Wahid, Indonesian journalist and politician, fourth President of Indonesia (b. 1940)
2010 – Bobby Farrell, Dutch dancer and performer from Aruba (b. 1949)
2011 – Ronald Searle, English-French cartoonist (b. 1920)
2012 – Philip Coppens, Belgian-American journalist and author (b. 1971)
  2012   – Beate Sirota Gordon, Austrian-American director and producer (b. 1923)
  2012   – Rita Levi-Montalcini, Italian neurologist and academic, Nobel Prize laureate (b. 1909)
  2012   – Carl Woese, American microbiologist and biophysicist (b. 1928)
  2012   – Dennis Ferguson, Australian sex offender (b. 1948)
2013 – Kinnaird R. McKee, American admiral (b. 1929)
  2013   – José María Maguregui, Spanish footballer and manager (b. 1934)
  2013   – Eiichi Ohtaki, Japanese singer-songwriter and producer (b. 1948)
  2013   – Johnny Orr, American basketball player and coach (b. 1927)
  2013   – Paul Sally, American mathematician and academic (b. 1933)
2014 – Terry Becker, American actor, director, and producer (b. 1921)
  2014   – Jim Galloway, Scottish-Canadian clarinet player and saxophonist (b. 1936)
  2014   – Luise Rainer, German-born American-British actress (b. 1910)
2015 – Doug Atkins, American football player (b. 1930)
  2015   – Howard Davis, Jr., American boxer and trainer (b. 1956)
  2015   – Mangesh Padgaonkar, Indian poet, playwright, and translator (b. 1929)
  2015   – Howard Pawley, Canadian lawyer and politician, 18th Premier of Manitoba (b. 1934)
2017 – Erica Garner, American civil rights activist (b. 1990)
2020 – Dawn Wells, American actress, (b. 1938)
2022 – Barbara Walters, American journalist, producer, and author (b. 1929)

Holidays and observances
Christian feast day:
Abraham the Writer
Anysia of Salonika
Egwin of Evesham
Frances Joseph-Gaudet (Episcopal Church) 
Liberius of Ravenna
Pope Felix I
Ralph of Vaucelles
Roger of Cannae
December 30 (Eastern Orthodox liturgics)
Day of the Declaration of Slovakia as an Independent Ecclesiastic Province (Slovakia)
Rizal Day (Philippines)
The fifth day of Kwanzaa (United States)
The sixth of the Twelve Days of Christmas (Western Christianity)

References

External links

 BBC: On This Day
 
 Historical Events on December 30

Days of the year
December